The Fragile Families and Child Wellbeing Study (FFCWS) is a longitudinal birth cohort study of American families. Core aims of the study are to learn about the capabilities and relationships of unmarried parents and how the families and children fare on various health and social measures over time. The FFCWS uses a stratified random sampling technique and an oversample of non-marital births. Baseline data collection ran from 1998 to 2000, featuring interviews with both biological parents shortly after children's births as well as the collection of medical records. Follow-up interviews were conducted when the children were 1, 3, 5, 9, 15, and 22 years old. In addition to parent interviews, the follow-up waves included in-home assessments, child care or teacher questionnaires, and interviews with the child. 

Most data for the FFCWS is available for free. Through the study, researchers found that unmarried parents and their children face a host of social challenges and tend to have loving but ultimately unstable relationships. The FFCWS has also provided material for reflections on data quality and survey methodologies. The study is run by Princeton University and Columbia University.

Research topics 
By "fragile families," the FFCWS research team mostly means families with children born out of wedlock. Nonmarital childbearing is associated with a wide range of social problems, including poverty, impaired child development, and poor school achievement. These issues disproportionately affect marginalized social groups like African Americans and Hispanic Americans and are likely contributors to the intergenerational reproduction of social inequalities between various social groups. However, until the late 1990s, even though the number of nonmarital births had increased rapidly, social scientists had gathered limited data on nonmarital childbearing and its impact on parents, children, and communities. The FFCWS hopes to better understand the underlying causes of social problems associated with fragile families and study the effectiveness of policies that might reduce nonmarital childbirths or mitigate their effects. 

The FFCWS mainly seeks four types of information concerning nonmarital childbearing: (1) socioeconomic background of unmarried parents, especially fathers; (2) relationship patterns between unmarried parents; (3) life outcomes of children in these families; and (4) the impact of policies and environmental conditions on families and children. Some of the major topic areas covered are as follows:
 Household characteristics: roster of family members, family members' demographic information, child's living arrangements, employment and income, housing and neighborhood characteristics, religion
 Incarceration: current status and history of parents and new partners
 Family relationships: relationship between the biological parents, new partnerships, social support, church attendance, civic participation
 Parental health and cognitive ability: physical health, mental health, cognitive ability
 Parenting: nurturance, discipline, cognitive stimulation, relationship with child, Child Protective Services involvement
 Child health and development: child use of medical care, child health, child nutrition, daily routines, cognitive development, child behavior, child relationships
 Child care/kindergarten: child care use, child care provider characteristics
 Elementary school: school characteristics, classroom characteristics, teacher characteristics, child's behavior, special education services, comparative academic performance, parental involvement
 Genetic analysis: mother and child, genetic predisposition, gene-environment interaction
 Program participation: Temporary Assistance for Needy Families, food stamps, Medicaid, Earned Income Tax Credit, child support enforcement, housing

Survey process

Sampling 
The 4,898 children in the FFCWS were born in hospitals in 20 large cities across the United States between 1998 and 2000. These cities all had populations above 200,000 and were selected for diversity in child support enforcement, labor market conditions, and welfare generosity. Instead of drawing simple random samples directly from the cities' newborn populations, the researchers first sampled hospitals within each city and then sampled births from each hospital.

Although non-marital births accounted for only a third of U.S. births at the time the study began, they make up around three-quarters of the Fragile Families sample. The use of an oversample of unmarried couples makes survey participants disproportionately low-income and thus especially relevant for studying various social disadvantages. The FFCWS public data files include weights for each wave of data collection that can be used to make the sample representative of urban births nationwide.

Survey administration 
After informed consent was obtained from the focal children's parents, baseline data collection consisted of an in-person interview with the biological mother and biological father, usually at the hospital shortly after the child's birth. Medical records for the mother and infant were also collected when possible.

The parents were each interviewed in a follow-up wave after roughly one year. For most interviewees, the study occurred over the telephone. For those not directly reachable by phone, researchers sent out local field interviewers to encourage participants to either call the interview administrators back or partake in at-home interviews.

When the child was three, the parents were interviewed again by phone. There was also a visit to the child's home and an in-person interview with the child's primary caregiver. The primary caregiver was usually the mother, but it could also be the father or someone else who spent the most time with custody over the child in a family setting, like a grandparent. If present, the mother and the child would complete cognitive assessments, and their heights and weights were collected. The interviewer also gathered observational data on the home environment, the appearance and behaviors of the family, and the neighborhood. In 15 of the 20 cities, the non-familial child care setting--a child care center or an informal child care arrangement--was also observed, and a caretaker at these institutions completed a survey.

The Year 5 interview contained the same components as the Year 3 interview, except that in Year 5 the child's kindergarten teacher also completed the Kindergarten Study Teacher Survey. Through this survey, the teacher provided information about themselves, their observations of the child's academic skills and behavior, and data on the school climate, school resources, and classroom characteristics.

Around the child's ninth birthday, both parents were interviewed by phone. Again, a home visit included a primary caregiver interview and physical and cognitive assessments of the child. The primary caregiver also filled out a paper survey. This wave included the first in-person interview with the child and the collection of saliva samples by the mother and child for DNA analysis. The children themselves were asked for informed assent before the study  All families with home visits were then asked for contact information for the child's elementary school teacher, who was mailed a survey.

Data collection for Year 15 began in February 2014 and ended March 2017. Year 15 included interviews with the primary caregiver and the teen. Home visits were conducted for a subset of the sample. Collaborative projects included a sleep and physical activity study from the in-home sample, an adolescent brain development study in three cities, and a mobile diary study of adolescent relationships.

In late 2020, the seventh wave of data collection started for 22-year-olds and their families, including the children's partners and the children's own children. This wave contains interviews for the 22-year-olds and their primary caregivers from the past. DNA data, brain data, sleep data, cardiovascular health data, and administrative data are being collected.

Data sharing 
Public data for the FFCWS are available for free. They contain 17,002 variables and are hosted in the Office of Population Research's data archive. Some of these variables are constructed variables that combine information from several directly collected variables to more reliably measure social concepts. Examples of these constructed variables include scores for the Peabody Picture Vocabulary Test and the Woodcock-Johnson Comprehension Test. More sensitive information, such as certain geographic identifiers and contextual census data, has to be obtained on a contract basis. The multi-domain nature of the FFCWS's data increases the risk for participants to be personally identified.

Metadata, or descriptions of the data, are freely available for the FFCWS. By 2018, the FFCWS had undergone a major redesign of metadata presentation system. Now, the metadata are available are not only in the form of human-readable documents but also in the form of machine-readable data tables.

Findings 
Hundreds of peer-reviewed articles, books and book chapters, and dissertations or theses have been written using data from the FFCWS. Together with sociologists Ron Haskins and Elisabeth Donahue, McLanahan, Garfinkel, and Mincy summarized in 2010 that the FFCWS had four major findings. Firstly, despite earlier conceptions, a large majority of unmarried parents have intimate and loving relationships when their children are born. Over 50% of the unwed couples surveyed in the baseline were living together, and another 36% were dating each other. Secondly, unmarried parents face numerous challenges regarding career opportunities, family life, and child rearing. Unmarried mothers were on average six years younger than married mothers but were three times more likely to have had another child with another partner. The presence of multiple father figures inside and outside the family can result in significant social tensions. In addition, unwed parents report lower incomes, poorer health, and higher rates of substance abuse. Unmarried fathers are five times more likely to have a prison record, and incarceration was shown to have darkened employment prospects and disrupted family relations. Perhaps as a result, the FFCWS's third major finding suggests that despite initial closeness, families with unwed parents prove relatively unstable, with only 35% of the couples staying together when the child reached the age of 5. Finally, births to unmarried parents are associated with poorer test performance and increased behavioral problems for children.

Given the study findings, McLanahan and colleagues called for policies that support single parents, prevent births out of wedlock, reduce prison sentences for young men, and offer relationship counseling to young couples. In 2002, the study's findings inspired Building Strong Families, a federal program that educates low-income, unmarried parents on what makes successful couples, providing support when parents encounter problems related to employment and health.

Data quality 
Sociologist Robert L. Wagmiller, Jr. describes the timing of the in-hospital baseline interview as a “magical moment” that allowed researchers to enroll people who would have been unable to participate under other circumstances. According to sociologist Kathleen Kiernan's review of large-scale studies on Western families, the Fragile Families Study differs from most other studies starting between the mid-1990s and mid-2010s because of the project's diligence in tracking non-custodial parents, generally fathers living outside the household. 

However, the project has several limitations. The research team excluded births in hospitals where less than 10% of the births were out of wedlock. The researchers also excluded parents who planned to put their children up for adoption or who were below the age of 18 and were prohibited from giving interviews per hospital policy. Such exclusions create selection bias and render the sample less representative of the US population. Even within the selected sampling frame, non-response bias occurs. Many parents did not participate in the study because they could not complete the interviews in English or Spanish, and many fathers could not be contacted for interview. Finally, social desirability bias may cause respondents to underreport substance abuse and domestic violence. In 2017, a team of scholars led by sociologist Matthew J. Salganik organized a Fragile Families Challenge, which invited 160 teams from across the world to apply machine learning algorithms to data from Years 0 to 9 to predict six outcomes in Year 15. None made very accurate predictions.

Funding and management 
The FFCWS is a joint project of Princeton University and Columbia University and is funded by a consortium of 25 private foundations and government agencies. At Princeton, the project is actively managed through the Bendheim-Thoman Center for Research on Child Wellbeing and the Center for Health and Wellbeing. It is Princeton's Institutional Review Board that oversees ethnical considerations related to the study. At Columbia, this project is managed by the Columbia Population Research Center and the National Center for Children and Families. The project was founded by Princeton sociologist Sara McLanahan and Columbia sociologists Irwin Garfinkel and Ron Mincy. The current principal investigators of the project are sociologist Kathryn Edin from Princeton and social economist Jane Waldfogel from Columbia. Previous principal investigators include McLananhan, Garfinkel, and Mincy, plus Princeton economist and public health expert Christina Paxson and Columbia psychologist Jeanne Brooks-Gunn.

Data collection for Year 9 and Year 15 of the FFCWS was partly administered by the research service provider Westat. The previous four waves of data collection were conducted by Mathematica Policy Research, and the first wave was also conducted by the National Opinion Research Center.

See also
 Early Childhood Longitudinal Program
 Family structure in the United States
 Millennium Cohort Study
 National Longitudinal Study of Adolescent to Adult Health
 The Negro Family: The Case For National Action, 1965

References

External links 
 Fragile Families official website
 Fragile Families Challenge
 Bendheim-Thoman Center for Research on Child Wellbeing
 Center for Health and Wellbeing
 Columbia Population Research Center
 National Center for Children and Families

Works about families
Sociology of the family
American families
Longitudinal sociological studies